Aleksei Ulianov is a Russian kickboxer who competes in the Glory Featherweight division. He is a two time Tatneft Cup 70kg tournament winner.

As of 8 February 2022, Combat Press ranks him as the #7 featherweight kickboxer in the world.

Kickboxing career
Ulianov made his professional debut against Saksurin Cafefarsai at Nord Desant Fight Fest, with the fight ending in a draw. 

He afterwards entered the 2014 Tatneft Cup 70kg tournament. In the first round, he knocked out Antero Hynynen, and beat Karol Lada and Itay Gershon by decision in the quarterfinal and semifinal respectively. Ulianov faced Rosario Presti in the finals. He won the fight by decision. 

He entered the 2016 edition of the tournament as well, and beat Ilya Sokolov in the semifinals by decision to earn a spot in the finals, where he faced Maksim Smirnov. Ulianov defeated Smirnov by decision. 

Ulianov faced former Interim Colosseum Tournament Featherweight Champion Vlad Trif on February 5, 2022, at Muaythai Factory. He won the fight controversially via split decision. Combat Press claimed that multiple experts scored the fight in favor of Trif.

Titles and achievements

Amateur
Russian Muay Thai Federation
 9x Russia Muay Thai Champion (2007, 2008, 2012, 2013, 2015, 2016, 2018, 2019, 2021)
 5x Russian Cup Winner (2007, 2009, 2011, 2012, 2013)

International Federation of Muaythai Associations
 2008 IFMA European Championship -63.5kg 
 2009 IFMA European Championship -63.5kg 
 2012 IFMA European Championship -67kg 
 2016 IFMA World Cup in Kazan -67kg

Professional
Tatneft Cup
 2014 Tatneft Cup -70 kg Champion
 2016 Tatneft Cup -70 kg Champion

Fight record

|-  style="background:#cfc;"
| 2023-02-18 || Win ||align=left| Alexander Skvortsov || RCC Fair Fight 20, Tournament Semifinals || Yekaterinburg, Russia || Decision (Unanimous) ||3  ||3:00 
|-
|- style="background:#cfc;"
| 2022-12-10|| Win||align=left| Denis Varaksa || ASI Championship Power of Siberia 6 || Kemerovo, Russia || TKO (retirement) || 2 || 3:00 
|- style="background:#fbb;"
| 2022-11-26|| Loss ||align=left| Mamuka Usubyan || RCC Fair Fight 19 || Yekaterinburg, Russia || Decision (Split) || 5 || 3:00 
|-
! style=background:white colspan=9 |
|-
|- style="background:#cfc;"
| 2022-02-05 || Win ||align=left| Vlad Trif || Muaythai Factory || Kemerovo, Russia || Decision (Split) || 3 || 3:00
|- style="background:#cfc;"
| 2021-10-23 || Win ||align=left| Serhiy Adamchuk || Glory Collision 3 || Arnhem, Netherlands ||  Decision (Split) || 3 || 3:00
|-  style="text-align:center; background:#cfc;" 
| 2021-08-28 || Win ||align=left| Vadim Vaskov || Fair Fight XV || Yekaterinburg, Russia || Decision (Unanimous)|| 3 ||3:00

|-  bgcolor="#FFBBBB"
| 2019-12-21|| Loss||align=left| Serhiy Adamchuk || Glory Collision 2 || Arnhem, Netherlands || Decision (Split) || 3 || 3:00
|-  bgcolor="#CCFFCC"
| 2019-06-22|| Win||align=left| Masaya Kubo || Glory 66: Paris || Paris, France || Decision (Uannimous) || 3 || 3:00
|- style="background:#FFBBBB;"
| 2018-12-22|| Loss|| align="left" | Pakorn PKSaenchaimuaythaigym || Muaythai Factory ||Russia || Decision (Unanimous) || 5 || 3:00
|-
! style=background:white colspan=9 |
|-  style="background:#CCFFCC;"
| 2018-11-03 || Win||align=left| Wang Pengfei ||Wu Lin Feng 2018: WLF -67kg World Cup 2018-2019 5th Round || China || Decision|| 3 || 3:00
|-  bgcolor="#CCFFCC"
| 2018-09-29|| Win||align=left| Zakaria Zouggary || Glory 59: Amsterdam || Amsterdam, Netherlands || Decision (Unanimous) || 3 || 3:00
|-  style="background:#CCFFCC;"
| 2018-09-01 || Win ||align=left| Jomthong Chuwattana || Wu Lin Feng 2018: WLF -67kg World Cup 2018-2019 3rd Round || Zhengzhou, China || Decision  || 3 || 3:00
|-  style="background:#CCFFCC;"
| 2018-07-07 || Win ||align=left| Liu Yong || Wu Lin Feng 2018: WLF -67kg World Cup 2018-2019 1st Round || Zhengzhou, China || Decision  || 3 || 3:00
|-  style="background:#CCFFCC;"
| 2018-03-09 || Win ||align=left| Massaro Glunder || Glory 64: Strasbourg  || Strasbourg, France || Decision (Unanimous) || 3 || 3:00
|- style="background:#c5d2ea;"
| 2018-06-02|| NC||align=left| Bailey Sugden || Glory 54: Birmingham || Birmingham, United Kingdom ||Doctor stoppage (accidental headbutt) || 2||
|-  style="background:#FFBBBB;"
| 2017-12-23 || Loss||align=left| Qiu Jianliang || Glory of Heroes: Jinan - GOH 65 kg Championship Tournament, Semi-Finals || Jinan, China || Decision (Unanimous) || 3 || 3:00
|-
|- style="background:#FFBBBB;"
| 2017-07-14 || Loss||align=left| Giga Chikadze || Glory 43: New York || New York, United States || Decision (Split) || 3 || 3:00
|- style="background:#FFBBBB;"
| 2017-03-25 || Loss||align=left| Petpanomrung Kiatmuu9 || Glory 39: Brussels - Featherweight Contender Tournament, Semi Finals || Brussels, Belgium || Decision (Unanimous) || 3 || 3:00
|-  style="background:#CCFFCC;"  
| 2016-12-23||Win||align=left| Jia Aoqi || Wu Fight || China ||  Decision || 3 || 3:00
|-  style="background:#CCFFCC;"  
| 2016-11-11||Win||align=left| Maksim Smirnov || Tatneft Cup, -70 kg Tournament Final|| Kazan, Russia || Ext.R Decision || 4 || 3:00
|-
! style=background:white colspan=9 |
|-  style="background:#CCFFCC;"  
| 2016-09-22||Win||align=left| Ilya Sokolov || Tatneft Cup, -70 kg Tournament Semi Final || Kazan, Russia || Ext.R Decision || 4 || 3:00
|-  style="background:#FFBBBB;"  
| 2016-08-11||Loss||align=left| Said Magomedov || Tatneft Cup || Kazan, Russia || Ext.R Decision || 4 || 3:00
|-  style="background:#CCFFCC;"  
| 2016-03-06||Win||align=left| Dastan Sharsheev || Tatneft Cup || Kazan, Russia ||  Decision || 3 || 3:00
|-  style="background:#FFBBBB;"  
| 2015-12-19||Loss||align=left| Youssef Assouik || Muay Thai Moscow || Samara, Russia ||  TKO (Doctor stoppage/cut)|| 1 ||2:10
|-  style="background:#fbb;"
| 2015-10-03 || Loss||align=left| Pakorn PKSaenchaimuaythaigym|| Xtreme Muay Thai 2015 || Macao || Decision || 5 || 3:00
|-  style="background:#CCFFCC;"  
| 2014-09-13||Win||align=left| Rosario Presti || Tatneft Cup, Final || Kazan, Russia || Ext.R Decision || 4 || 3:00 
|-
! style=background:white colspan=9 |
|-  style="background:#CCFFCC;"  
| 2014-07-18||Win||align=left| Itay Gershon || Tatneft Cup, Semi Final || Kazan, Russia || Ext.R Decision || 4 || 3:00
|-  style="background:#CCFFCC;"  
| 2014-04-16||Win||align=left| Karol Lada || Tatneft Cup, Quarter Final || Kazan, Russia || Decision || 3 || 3:00
|-  style="background:#CCFFCC;"  
| 2014-03-19||Win||align=left|  Antero Hynynen || Tatneft Cup || Kazan, Russia ||  KO (Right High Kick) || 2 ||
|-  style="background:#c5d2ea;"  
| 2013-05-11||Draw||align=left|  Saksurin Cafefarsai  || Nord Desant Fight Fest || Khanty-Mansiysk, Russia ||  Decision || 5 || 3:00
|-  style="background:#fbb;"  
| 2012-12-08|| Loss ||align=left| Sergey Kulyaba || Commonwealth Cup Team Russia VS Team CIS || Novossibirsk, Russia ||  Decision  || 3 || 3:00
|-  style="background:#CCFFCC;"  
| 2011-09-08||Win||align=left| Chalermdeth infinity || Elite Fight Night Russia || Tyumen, Russia || Decision || 5 || 3:00
|-  style="background:#CCFFCC;"  
| 2011-||Win||align=left| Ruslan Berdyev ||  || Russia || KO (High kick) || 1 || 
|-
| colspan=9 | Legend:    

|-  style="background:#fbb;"
| 2016-11-26|| Loss||align=left| Sergey Kulyaba|| IFMA World Cup 2016 in Kazan, Final || Kazan, Russia || Decision || 3 ||3:00
|-
! style=background:white colspan=9 |
|-  style="background:#cfc;"
| 2016-11-23|| Loss||align=left| Nikolay Samussev || IFMA World Cup 2016 in Kazan, Semi Finals || Kazan, Russia || Decision || 3 ||3:00

|-  style="background:#fbb;"
| 2013-10-20 || Loss || align=left|  || SportAccord World Combat Games || Saint-Petersburg, Russia || Decision || 3 || 3:00 

|-  style="background:#fbb;"
| 2012-09-09 || Loss||align=left| Andrei Kulebin || 2012 IFMA World Championships 2012, Quarter Finals || Saint Petersburg, Russia || Decision  || 4 ||2:00 

|-  style="background:#fbb;"
| 2012-05-|| Loss||align=left| Sergey Kulyaba|| 2012 IFMA European Championship, Semi Finals || Antalya, Turkey || Doctor stoppage|| 1 ||
|-
! style=background:white colspan=9 |

|-  style="background:#fbb;"
| 2011-04-27 || Loss ||align=left| Andrei Kulebin || I.F.M.A. European Muaythai Championships '11, Quarter Finals -67 kg || Antalya, Turkey || TKO (Ref Stop) || 3 ||  

|-
| colspan=9 | Legend:

References

1988 births
Living people
Russian male kickboxers
Glory kickboxers